Javad Zarincheh (born July 23, 1966) is a former Iranian football player, coach and a football administrator. He is currently team manager of Esteghlal. He played for the Iran national football team and was a participant at the 1998 FIFA World Cup.

Career
Zarincheh was considered one of the best right wing backs in the history of Iranian football. However, late in his career he was playing as a sweeper. There was a rumor that Mohammad Mayelikohan, Iran's head coach back in the time, didn't invite him to the national team, due to his hostility with Esteghlal's players. That's why Zarincheh was never invited to the national team, when Mayelikohan was the head coach. After Mayelikohan was sacked, Bijan Zolfagharnasab invited him to the national team. In the 1998 World Cup, he played as the right wing for the Iranian national team. Iran's first goal against the United States was assisted by Zaricheh.

The 1998 World Cup competition was his last competition with the national team.

Coaching
He was chosen as the assistant manager of Esteghlal for 2014–2015 season.

Honours

Player
Esteghlal
Iranian league (3): 1989–90,1997–98, 2000–01
Hazfi Cup (2): 1995–96, 1999–00

Career statistics

International goals

References

Notes

External links
RSSSF archive of Javad Zarincheh's international appearances

1966 births
Living people
People from Tehran
Iranian footballers
saba players
keshavarz players
Esteghlal F.C. players
Esteghlal F.C. managers
1988 AFC Asian Cup players
1992 AFC Asian Cup players
1998 FIFA World Cup players
Iran international footballers
Asian Games gold medalists for Iran
Asian Games medalists in football
Footballers at the 1990 Asian Games
Footballers at the 1994 Asian Games
Footballers at the 1998 Asian Games
Association football defenders
Medalists at the 1990 Asian Games
Medalists at the 1998 Asian Games
Iranian football managers
Aluminium Hormozgan F.C. managers
20th-century Iranian people